The Methodist Episcopal Church South, also known as the Corvallis United Methodist Church, is a historic Methodist church  at the junction of Cemetery Road (formerly First Street) and Eastside Highway in Corvallis, Montana. The church, built in 1894, was organized as a congregation of the old Methodist Episcopal Church, South, which in 1939 merged with what is now the United Methodist Church. On November 24, 1997, the church building was added to the National Register of Historic Places.

References

External links
 Corvallis United Methodist Church website

Churches on the National Register of Historic Places in Montana
Churches completed in 1894
19th-century Methodist church buildings in the United States
United Methodist churches in Montana
Southern Methodist churches in the United States
National Register of Historic Places in Ravalli County, Montana
1894 establishments in Montana
Victorian architecture in Montana